Darshana Jardosh (born 21 January 1961) is an Indian politician and currently serving as Union State Minister of Railways and Union State Minister of Textiles. She is member of the Lok Sabha representing the Surat constituency in Gujarat. She is a member of the Bharatiya Janata Party and was elected to 15th Lok Sabha in 2009, following by to 16th Lok Sabha in 2014 and 17th Lok Sabha in 2019.

Career

She was elected to 15th Lok Sabha in 2009.

In 2009, she demanded that the government set up an international airport in Surat to boost diamond trade. In 2012, she criticised Congress MP Tushar Chaudhary for trying to take credit for flight connectivity to Surat, which she and Navasari MP CR Patil campaigned for.

She was re-elected as the Member of Parliament in the 2014 elections to the Lok Sabha from Surat. She won with a historic margin of 5,33,190 votes which is the highest lead by any woman MP in Indian Electoral History after Smt.Indira Gandhi and the 4th highest lead in the 2014 elections. She won with a 76.6% vote share which is a record for the 2014 elections.

She was re-elected as the Member of Parliament in the 2019 elections to the Lok Sabha from surat with 7,95,651 votes. She took oath as a Minister of State for Railways on 7th July 2021 during Narendra Modi's ministry expansion at Rashtrapati Bhavan.

References

External links
 Detailed Profile in the Government of India portal
 Darshana Jardosh on Twitter
 Darshana Jardosh on Facebook

1961 births
Living people
India MPs 2009–2014
People from Surat
Women in Gujarat politics
Lok Sabha members from Gujarat
India MPs 2014–2019
Ahmedabad municipal councillors
21st-century Indian women politicians
21st-century Indian politicians
Bharatiya Janata Party politicians from Gujarat
Politicians from Surat
India MPs 2019–present
Narendra Modi ministry
Women union ministers of state of India
Women members of the Lok Sabha